The  Ghadir missile is an Iranian anti-ship cruise missile with a range of 330 km. The missile is capable of being employed both from shore and from ships afloat. The missile was unveiled in Tehran in 2014 in an event attended Hossein Dehghan, Defense Minister of the Islamic Republic of Iran.

References 

Anti-ship missiles of Iran
Anti-ship cruise missiles
Islamic Republic of Iran Navy
Cruise missiles
Cruise missiles of Iran
Guided missiles of Iran
Anti-ship cruise missiles of Iran